This is a list of 381 species in Orthotylus, a genus of plant bugs in the family Miridae.

Orthotylus species

 Orthotylus acacicola Lindberg, 1958 c g
 Orthotylus aceris Lindberg, 1940 c g
 Orthotylus achilleae Putshkov and Putshkov, 1979 c g
 Orthotylus adenocarpi (Perris, 1857) c g
 Orthotylus aesculicola Blinn, 1987 c g
 Orthotylus affinis Van Duzee, 1916 i c g
 Orthotylus aineias Linnavuori, 1994 c g
 Orthotylus akastos Linnavuori, 1994 c g
 Orthotylus akheloos Linnavuori, 1994 c g
 Orthotylus alaiensis Reuter, 1883 c g
 Orthotylus albocostatus Van Duzee, 1918 c g b
 Orthotylus albovittatus Reuter, 1901 c g
 Orthotylus alni Knight, 1923 i c g
 Orthotylus althaia Linnavuori, 1994 c g
 Orthotylus angeloi Carvalho, 1986 c g
 Orthotylus angulatus (Uhler, 1895) i c g
 Orthotylus anjuanensis Carvalho, 1985 c g
 Orthotylus antidesmae Polhemus, 2005 c g
 Orthotylus antidesmoides Polhemus, 2011 c g
 Orthotylus apodiensis Carvalho and Costa, 1990 c g
 Orthotylus arabicus Wagner, 1962 c g
 Orthotylus aragarssanus Carvalho and Costa, 1990 c g
 Orthotylus argentinus (Carvalho, 1985) c g
 Orthotylus armoricanus Ehanno and Matocq, 1990 c g
 Orthotylus arthrophyti Wagner, 1969 c g
 Orthotylus asper Linnavuori, 1975 c g
 Orthotylus atriplicis (Knight, 1968) c g
 Orthotylus attali Morkel and Wyniger, 2009 c g
 Orthotylus aureopubescens (Carvalho and Schaffner, 1973) c g
 Orthotylus azalais Kirkaldy, 1902 i c g
 Orthotylus bahianus Carvalho, 1976 c g
 Orthotylus basicornis Knight, 1923 i c g
 Orthotylus beieri Wagner, 1942 c g
 Orthotylus bilineatus (Fallén, 1807) c g
 Orthotylus blascoi Ribes, 1991 c g
 Orthotylus bobo Linnavuori, 1994 c g
 Orthotylus bonaerensis (Carvalho and Carpintero, 1986) c g
 Orthotylus boreellus (Zetterstedt, 1828) c g
 Orthotylus boydi (Schwartz and Wall, 2001) c g
 Orthotylus brasiliensis (Carvalho and Schaffner, 1973) c g
 Orthotylus brevirostris (Knight, 1968) c g
 Orthotylus brindleyi (Knight, 1968) c g
 Orthotylus brunneus Van Duzee, 1916 i c g
 Orthotylus bureschi Josifov, 1969 c g
 Orthotylus calderensis (Carvalho and Carpintero, 1991) c g
 Orthotylus calichi Tamanini, 1980 c g
 Orthotylus callitris Lindberg, 1940 c g
 Orthotylus candidatus Van Duzee, 1916 i c g b
 Orthotylus caprai Wagner, 1955 c g
 Orthotylus carinatus Wagner, 1968 c g
 Orthotylus carioca Carvalho, 1990 c g
 Orthotylus castaneus Carvalho and Costa, 1990 c g
 Orthotylus catarinensis Carvalho, 1985 c g
 Orthotylus catulus Van Duzee, 1916 c g
 Orthotylus caviceps Wagner, 1971 c g
 Orthotylus celtidis Henry, 1979 i c g
 Orthotylus ceratoides Muminov, 1990 c g
 Orthotylus chapadensis Carvalho, 1985 c g
 Orthotylus chilensis Carvalho and Fontes, 1973 c g
 Orthotylus choii Josifov, 1976 c g
 Orthotylus chullan Forero, 2009 c g
 Orthotylus clarensis Carvalho and Costa, 1990 c g
 Orthotylus clermontiae Polhemus, 2002 c g
 Orthotylus clermonticola Polhemus, 2005 c g
 Orthotylus clermontiella Polhemus, 2005 c g
 Orthotylus clermontioides Polhemus, 2005 c g
 Orthotylus clermontiopsis Polhemus, 2011 c g
 Orthotylus coagulatus (Uhler, 1877) c g b
 Orthotylus compactus Linnavuori, 1975 c g
 Orthotylus concolor (Kirschbaum, 1856) c g
 Orthotylus contrarius Wagner, 1953 c g
 Orthotylus contrastus Van Duzee, 1925 i c g
 Orthotylus coprosmae Polhemus, 2002 c g
 Orthotylus coprosmaphagus Polhemus, 2011 c g
 Orthotylus coprosmaphila Polhemus, 2005 c g
 Orthotylus coprosmicola Polhemus, 2005 c g
 Orthotylus coprosmivorus Polhemus, 2011 c g
 Orthotylus coprosmoides Polhemus, 2002 c g
 Orthotylus coprosmopsis Polhemus, 2005 c g
 Orthotylus cornichus Wagner, 1969 c g
 Orthotylus cornupunctus Ghauri, 1972 c g
 Orthotylus costai Kerzhner and Schuh, 1995 c g
 Orthotylus creticus Wagner, 1977 c g
 Orthotylus cruciatus Van Duzee, 1916 i c g
 Orthotylus cuneatus Van Duzee, 1916 i c g
 Orthotylus cupressi Reuter, 1883 c g
 Orthotylus curvipennis Reuter, 1875 c g
 Orthotylus custeri (Knight, 1968) c g
 Orthotylus cyanescens Carvalho and Ferreira, 1986 c g
 Orthotylus daphne Kirkaldy, 1902 i c g
 Orthotylus diamantinus Carvalho, 1984 c g
 Orthotylus digitus Carapezza, 1997 c g
 Orthotylus dimorphus Wagner, 1958 c g
 Orthotylus diospyri Polhemus, 2002 c g
 Orthotylus diospyricola Polhemus, 2005 c g
 Orthotylus diospyroides Polhemus, 2005 c g
 Orthotylus diospyropsis Polhemus, 2005 c g
 Orthotylus diospyvivorus Polhemus, 2011 c g
 Orthotylus divisus Linnavuori, 1961 c g
 Orthotylus dodgei Van Duzee, 1921 i c g
 Orthotylus dorsalis (Provancher, 1872) i c g b
 Orthotylus dubautiae Polhemus, 2011 c g
 Orthotylus dubauticola Polhemus, 2011 c g
 Orthotylus dumosus Seidenstucker, 1971 c g
 Orthotylus elaeocarpi Polhemus, 2011 c g
 Orthotylus eleagni Jakovlev, 1881 c g
 Orthotylus elongatus Wagner, 1965 c g
 Orthotylus empetri Wagner, 1977 c g
 Orthotylus ericetorum (Fallén, 1807) c g
 Orthotylus ericinellae Poppius, 1910 c g
 Orthotylus erinaceae Wagner, 1977 c g
 Orthotylus esavianus Carvalho and Ferreira, 1986 c g
 Orthotylus euchloris Reuter, 1908 c g
 Orthotylus eurotiae (Knight, 1968) c g
 Orthotylus farcha Linnavuori, 1994 c g
 Orthotylus fieberi Frey-Gessner, 1864 c g
 Orthotylus flaviceps Wagner, 1974 c g
 Orthotylus flavinervis (Kirschbaum, 1856) c g
 Orthotylus flavosparsus (Sahlberg, 1842) i c g b
 Orthotylus flemingi Schwartz and Scudder, 2003 i c g
 Orthotylus formosus Van Duzee, 1916 i c g
 Orthotylus fraternus Van Duzee, 1916 i c g
 Orthotylus fuscescens (Kirschbaum, 1856) c g
 Orthotylus fuscicornis Knight, 1927 i c g
 Orthotylus fuscipennis Yasunaga, 1999 c g
 Orthotylus gemmae Gesse and Goula, 2003 c g
 Orthotylus genisticola Carapezza, 1997 c g
 Orthotylus globiceps Wagner, 1976 c g
 Orthotylus gotohi Yasunaga, 1993 c g
 Orthotylus gracilis Reuter, 1900 c g
 Orthotylus guaranianus Carvalho and Fontes, 1973 c g
 Orthotylus halaibicus Linnavuori, 1975 c g
 Orthotylus halophilus Lindberg, 1953 c g
 Orthotylus hamatus Van Duzee, 1918 i c g
 Orthotylus harryi Kerzhner and Schuh, 1995 c g
 Orthotylus hazeltoni Kerzhner and Schuh, 1995 c g
 Orthotylus hedyoti Polhemus, 2002 c g
 Orthotylus hedyoticola Polhemus, 2002 c g
 Orthotylus hedyotiella Polhemus, 2005 c g
 Orthotylus hedyotioides Polhemus, 2005 c g
 Orthotylus hedyotiopsis Polhemus, 2002 c g
 Orthotylus hedyotiphila Polhemus, 2005 c g
 Orthotylus hedyotivorus Polhemus, 2005 c g
 Orthotylus hibisci Polhemus, 2002 c g
 Orthotylus hirtulus Wagner, 1951 c g
 Orthotylus hodiernus Linnavuori, 1961 c g
 Orthotylus ife Linnavuori, 1994 c g
 Orthotylus ilicis Polhemus, 2002 c g
 Orthotylus indigoferae Linnavuori, 1975 c g
 Orthotylus interpositus K. Schmidt, 1938 c g
 Orthotylus intricatus Wagner, 1975 c g
 Orthotylus iolani Kirkaldy, 1902 i c g
 Orthotylus japonicus Yasunaga, 1999 c g
 Orthotylus joacemensis (Carvalho and Costa, 1992) c g
 Orthotylus jordii Pagola-Carte and Zabalegui, 2006 c g
 Orthotylus josei Kerzhner and Schuh, 1995 c g
 Orthotylus josifovi Wagner, 1959 c g
 Orthotylus juglandis Henry, 1979 i c g
 Orthotylus junipericola Linnavuori, 1965 c g
 Orthotylus kakan Forero, 2009 c g
 Orthotylus kanakanus Kirkaldy, 1902 i c g
 Orthotylus kara Polhemus, 2005 c g
 Orthotylus kassandra Kirkaldy, 1902 i c g
 Orthotylus kassandroides Polhemus, 2005 c g
 Orthotylus kassandropsis Polhemus, 2005 c g
 Orthotylus katmai (Knight, 1921) i c g
 Orthotylus kekele Kirkaldy, 1902 i c g
 Orthotylus kenamuke Linnavuori, 1975 c g
 Orthotylus kikin Forero, 2009 c g
 Orthotylus knighti Van Duzee, 1916 i c g
 Orthotylus kogurjonicus Josifov, 1992 c g
 Orthotylus kopiko Polhemus, 2005 c g
 Orthotylus kopikocola Polhemus, 2011 c g
 Orthotylus kopikoides Polhemus, 2011 c g
 Orthotylus kopikopsis Polhemus, 2011 c g
 Orthotylus kopikovorus Polhemus, 2011 c g
 Orthotylus korbanus Wagner, 1977 c g
 Orthotylus kurilensis Kerzhner, 1997 c g
 Orthotylus kymgangsanicus Josifov, 1987 c g
 Orthotylus languidus Van Duzee, 1916 i c g
 Orthotylus lateralis Van Duzee, 1916 i c g
 Orthotylus leokhares Linnavuori, 1990 c g
 Orthotylus leonardi Kerzhner and Schuh, 1995 c g
 Orthotylus lesbicus Wagner, 1975 c g
 Orthotylus lethierryi Reuter, 1875 c g
 Orthotylus leviculus (Knight, 1927) c g
 Orthotylus mafraq Linnavuori and Al-Safadi, 1993 c g
 Orthotylus major (Wagner, 1969) c g
 Orthotylus manauensis Carvalho, 1983 c g
 Orthotylus manoniella Polhemus, 2011 c g
 Orthotylus manono Polhemus, 2011 c g
 Orthotylus manonocola Polhemus, 2011 c g
 Orthotylus manonoides Polhemus, 2011 c g
 Orthotylus manonophagus Polhemus, 2011 c g
 Orthotylus manonophila Polhemus, 2011 c g
 Orthotylus manonovorus Polhemus, 2011 c g
 Orthotylus marginalis Reuter, 1883 c g
 Orthotylus marginatus (Uhler, 1895) i c
 Orthotylus mariagratiae Carapezza, 1984 c g
 Orthotylus martini Puton, 1887 c g
 Orthotylus massawanus Linnavuori, 1975 c g
 Orthotylus masutti Linnavuori, 1977 c g
 Orthotylus matocqi Carapezza, 1997 c g
 Orthotylus matogrossensis Carvalho, 1985 c g
 Orthotylus maurus Wagner, 1969 c g
 Orthotylus mayrii V. Signoret, 1880 c g
 Orthotylus melanotylus Kerzhner, 1962 c g
 Orthotylus melicopi Polhemus, 2005 c g
 Orthotylus melicopoides Polhemus, 2011 c g
 Orthotylus membraneus Lindberg, 1940 c g
 Orthotylus membranosus (Carvalho and Costa, 1992) c g
 Orthotylus mentor Linnavuori, 1994 c g
 Orthotylus metrosideri Polhemus, 2005 c g
 Orthotylus metrosideropsis Polhemus, 2011 c g
 Orthotylus mimus (Knight, 1927) c g
 Orthotylus minensis (Carvalho, 1985) c g
 Orthotylus minuendus Knight, 1925 i c g
 Orthotylus minutus Jakovlev, 1877 c g
 Orthotylus missionensis Carvalho, 1985 c g
 Orthotylus mistus Knight, 1925 c g
 Orthotylus modestus Van Duzee, 1916 i c g b
 Orthotylus molliculus Van Duzee, 1916 i c g
 Orthotylus mollis Linnavuori, 1975 c g
 Orthotylus moncreaffi (Douglas and Scott, 1874) c g
 Orthotylus monticalus Linnavuori, 1975 c g
 Orthotylus mourei Carvalho, 1985 c g
 Orthotylus mundricus Linnavuori, 1994 c g
 Orthotylus nassatus (Fabricius, 1787) i c g
 Orthotylus necopinus Van Duzee, 1916 i c g b
 Orthotylus neglectus Knight, 1923 i c g
 Orthotylus neocoprosmae Polhemus, 2002 c g
 Orthotylus neoilicis Polhemus, 2002 c g
 Orthotylus neopsychotriae Polhemus, 2005 c g
 Orthotylus neopsychotricus Polhemus, 2011 c g
 Orthotylus neopsychotrioides Polhemus, 2005 c g
 Orthotylus neopsychotriopsis Polhemus, 2011 c g
 Orthotylus nestegiae Polhemus, 2005 c g
 Orthotylus nigricollis Wagner, 1962 c g
 Orthotylus nigroluteus Carvalho and Ferreira, 1986 c g
 Orthotylus nocturnus Linnavuori, 1974 c g
 Orthotylus notabilis Knight, 1927 i c g
 Orthotylus nubaensis Linnavuori, 1975 c g
 Orthotylus nyctalis Knight, 1927 i c g
 Orthotylus nymphias Linnavuori, 1974 c g
 Orthotylus obscurus Reuter, 1875 c g
 Orthotylus ochrotrichus Fieber, 1864 i c g
 Orthotylus ohia Polhemus, 2011 c g
 Orthotylus olapa Polhemus, 2011 c g
 Orthotylus orientalis Poppius, 1915 c g
 Orthotylus ornatus Van Duzee, 1916 i c g b
 Orthotylus oschanini Reuter, 1883 c g
 Orthotylus pacificus Van Duzee, 1919 i c g
 Orthotylus pallens (Matsumura, 1911) c g
 Orthotylus pallidulus Reuter, 1904 c g
 Orthotylus palustris Reuter, 1888 c g
 Orthotylus paraguaiensis Carvalho and Costa, 1991 c g
 Orthotylus parvistylus Wagner, 1971 c g
 Orthotylus parvulus Reuter, 1879 c g
 Orthotylus paulinoi Reuter, 1885 c g
 Orthotylus pelagicus (Kirkaldy, 1909) c g
 Orthotylus pennsylvanicus Henry, 1979 i c g
 Orthotylus perkinsi Kirkaldy, 1902 i c g
 Orthotylus perrottetiae Polhemus, 2005 c g
 Orthotylus perrotteticola Polhemus, 2011 c g
 Orthotylus perrottetiopsis Polhemus, 2005 c g
 Orthotylus pilo Polhemus, 2005 c g
 Orthotylus pipturi Polhemus, 2002 c g
 Orthotylus pipturicola Polhemus, 2011 c g
 Orthotylus pipturiphila Polhemus, 2011 c g
 Orthotylus pipturoides Polhemus, 2002 c g
 Orthotylus pisoniacola Polhemus, 2011 c g
 Orthotylus pisoniae Polhemus, 2002 c g
 Orthotylus pisonioides Polhemus, 2002 c g
 Orthotylus pisoniopsis Polhemus, 2005 c g
 Orthotylus platensis Carvalho and Fontes, 1973 c g
 Orthotylus plucheae Van Duzee, 1925 i c g
 Orthotylus polemon Linnavuori, 1975 c g
 Orthotylus populi Drapolyuk, 1991 c g
 Orthotylus prasinus (Fallén, 1826) c g
 Orthotylus priesneri K. Schmidt, 1939 c g
 Orthotylus problematicus Linnavuori, 1953 c g
 Orthotylus prunicola Linnavuori, 1984 c g
 Orthotylus psalloides Wagner, 1959 c g
 Orthotylus pseudotantali Polhemus, 2002 c g
 Orthotylus psychotriae Polhemus, 2002 c g
 Orthotylus psychotricola Polhemus, 2002 c g
 Orthotylus psychotrioides Polhemus, 2002 c g
 Orthotylus pullatus Van Duzee, 1916 i c g
 Orthotylus pusillus Reuter, 1883 c g
 Orthotylus putshkovi Josifov, 1974 c g
 Orthotylus quercicola Reuter, 1885 c g
 Orthotylus ramus Knight, 1927 i c g
 Orthotylus repandus Linnavuori, 1975 c g
 Orthotylus ribesi Wagner, 1976 c g
 Orthotylus ricardoi Carvalho, 1988 c g
 Orthotylus riegeri Heckman, 2000 c g
 Orthotylus riodocensis Carvalho, 1986 c g
 Orthotylus riparius Kulik, 1973 c g
 Orthotylus robineaui Schwartz and Scudder, 2003 c g
 Orthotylus robiniae Johnston, 1935 i c g
 Orthotylus roppai Carvalho, 1985 c g
 Orthotylus roseipennis Reuter, 1905 c g
 Orthotylus rossi Knight, 1941 i c g
 Orthotylus rubidus (Puton, 1874) c g
 Orthotylus rubrocuneatus Linnavuori, 1975 c g
 Orthotylus salicis Jakovlev, 1893 c g
 Orthotylus salicorniae Lindberg, 1953 c g
 Orthotylus salsolae Reuter, 1875 c g
 Orthotylus saltensis (Carvalho, 1985) c g
 Orthotylus schoberiae Reuter, 1876 c g
 Orthotylus seabrai Carvalho, 1985 c g
 Orthotylus selene Linnavuori, 1994 c g
 Orthotylus senectus Van Duzee, 1916 c g
 Orthotylus serus Van Duzee, 1921 i c g
 Orthotylus sicilianus Wagner, 1954 c g
 Orthotylus sidnicus (Stal, 1859) c g
 Orthotylus singularis Carvalho and Carpintero, 1992 c g
 Orthotylus sinopensis Carvalho and Costa, 1990 c g
 Orthotylus siuranus Wagner, 1964 c g
 Orthotylus smaragdinus Liu, 2009 c g
 Orthotylus sophorae Josifov, 1976 c g
 Orthotylus sophoricola Polhemus, 2011 c g
 Orthotylus sophoroides Polhemus, 2005 c g
 Orthotylus spartiicola Reuter, 1904 c g
 Orthotylus spinosus Knight, 1925 i
 Orthotylus stanleyaea (Knight, 1968) c g
 Orthotylus stitti (Knight, 1968) c g
 Orthotylus stratensis Wagner, 1963 c g
 Orthotylus strigilifer Linnavuori, 1975 c g
 Orthotylus stysi Koziskova, 1967 c g
 Orthotylus submarginatus (Say, 1832) i c g b
 Orthotylus subtropicalis Kerzhner and Schuh, 1995 c g
 Orthotylus sulinus Carvalho and Wallerstein, 1978 c g
 Orthotylus sumaloensis (Carvalho and Carpintero, 1992) c g
 Orthotylus symphoricarpi (Knight, 1968) c g
 Orthotylus tabescens (Stal, 1858) c g
 Orthotylus tafoensis Kerzhner and Schuh, 1995 c g
 Orthotylus taksini Yasunaga and Yamada, 2009 c g
 Orthotylus tamarindi Linnavuori, 1975 c g
 Orthotylus tantali (Perkins, 1912) i c g
 Orthotylus tantanus Wagner, 1971 c g
 Orthotylus taxodii Knight, 1941 c g
 Orthotylus tenellus (Fallén, 1807) c g
 Orthotylus teutonianus Carvalho and Costa, 1992 c g
 Orthotylus thaleia Linnavuori, 1999 c g
 Orthotylus thymelaeae Eckerlein and Wagner, 1965 c g
 Orthotylus tijucanus Carvalho and Costa, 1990 c g
 Orthotylus troodensis Wagner, 1961 c g
 Orthotylus turanicus Reuter, 1883 c g
 Orthotylus turcmenorum V. Putshkov, 1976 c g
 Orthotylus ulaula Polhemus, 2005 c g
 Orthotylus uniformis Van Duzee, 1916 i c
 Orthotylus urerae Polhemus, 2002 c g
 Orthotylus ureraphila Polhemus, 2005 c g
 Orthotylus urericola Polhemus, 2005 c g
 Orthotylus utahensis (Knight, 1968) c g
 Orthotylus ute Knight, 1927 i c g b
 Orthotylus vanduzeei Carvalho, 1955 i
 Orthotylus vanettii Carvalho and Ferreira, 1986 c g
 Orthotylus veraensis Carvalho, 1990 c g
 Orthotylus vermelhensis (Carvalho and Costa, 1992) c g
 Orthotylus verticatus Wagner, 1958 c g
 Orthotylus vestitus (Uhler, 1890) c g
 Orthotylus vianai Carvalho and Carpintero, 1992 c g
 Orthotylus virens (Fallén, 1807) c g
 Orthotylus virescens (Douglas & Scott, 1865) c g b
 Orthotylus viridinervis (Kirschbaum, 1856) i c g
 Orthotylus viridis Van Duzee, 1916 i c g
 Orthotylus viridissimus Linnavuori, 1961 c g
 Orthotylus viridulus (Knight, 1928) c g
 Orthotylus vittiger Linnavuori, 1975 c g
 Orthotylus wallisi (Kelton, 1980) c g
 Orthotylus whiteheadi (T. Henry, 1991) c g
 Orthotylus wileyae (Knight, 1927) c g
 Orthotylus xanthopoda Yasunaga, 1999 c g
 Orthotylus xavantinus Carvalho and Costa, 1990 c g
 Orthotylus xylosmae Polhemus, 2002 c g
 Orthotylus xylosmicola Polhemus, 2005 c g
 Orthotylus xylosmoides Polhemus, 2005 c g
 Orthotylus zorensis Wagner, 1975 c g
 Othotylus taxodii Knight, 1925 i g

Data sources: i = ITIS, c = Catalogue of Life, g = GBIF, b = Bugguide.net

References

Orthotylus